Eupithecia sardoa is a moth in the family Geometridae. It is found in North Africa and on Corsica, Sardinia, and Mallorca. It was recently recorded from the Parco Naturale della Maremma in Italy.

Adults have elongated grey-brown forewings, paler hindwings and a wingspan between 17 and 20 mm.

References

Moths described in 1910
sardoa
Moths of Europe
Moths of Africa